Evangelos Koronios, most commonly known as Angelos Koronios (alternate spelling: Aggelos, Greek: Ευάγγελος "Άγγελος" Κορωνιός; born 16 March 1969), is a Greek former professional basketball player and coach.

Professional career
Born in Athens, Greece, Koronios started playing club basketball with the youth clubs of Peristeri Athens, in 1982. He began his pro career with the senior men's team of Peristeri, in 1986. In 1998, he moved to the Greek club AEK Athens, where he played for two seasons. Then, he continued his career with the Greek clubs PAOK Thessaliniki (2000–01), Maroussi Athens, for two seasons (2001–03), Panionios Athens (2003–04), and finally, with Olympiacos Piraeus (2004–05).

At the time of his retirement, Koronios was the unofficial all-time stats leader of the Greek Basket League, since the 1986–87 season in points scored, with 7,080, in assists, with 1,264, in steals, with 583, in free throws made, with 2,020, and in three pointers made, with 828. In total, Koronios appeared in 448 games in the top-tier level league of Greek basketball. Some of his Greek League career records were eventually broken by Nikos Boudouris, Dimitris Diamantidis, and Vassilis Spanoulis.

National team career
Koronios was a member of the senior Greek national basketball team. With Greece's senior national team, he played at the 1992 FIBA European Olympic Qualifying Tournament, at the 1997 FIBA EuroBasket, at the 1998 FIBA World Championship, and at the 1999 FIBA EuroBasket. He also won a silver medal at the 1991 Mediterranean Games.

Coaching career
In the 2005–06 season, Koronios started his coaching career, working as the head coach at Alimos. He spent the next season (2006–07) coaching Sporting, and with them, he won the Greek 2nd Division championship.

In the summer of 2007, he was appointed as the new head coach of AEK Athens, but he decided to resign, "for personal reasons", on 25 October. He was later appointed as the new head coach of AEK, following the departure of Minas Gekos from that position, in January 2011. After that, he was the head coach of Kavala, before returning to AEK Athens, as an assistant coach.

Awards and accomplishments

As a player

Pro clubs
 5× Greek League All-Star: (1994 I, 1996 I, 1996 II, 1997, 1999)
 Greek Cup Winner: (2000)
 FIBA Saporta Cup Champion: (2000)
 EuroLeague MVP of the Round: (Playoffs - Eighth-finals Game 3; 2000–01)
 Greek All-Star Game 3 Point Shootout Contest Champion: (2004)
 When he retired, he was the all-time leader in games played in the Greek Basketball Championship's Alpha 1 era (since the 1986–87 season).
 When he retired, he was the all-time leader in steals in the Greek Basketball Championship's Alpha 1 era (since the 1986–87 season).
 He is the all-time leader in 3 pointers made in the Greek Basketball Championship's Alpha 1 era (since the 1986–87 season).
 He is the all-time leading scorer of the Greek Basketball Championship's Alpha 1 era (since the 1986–87 season).
 He is the 6th all-time leading scorer of the Greek Basketball Championship's Alpha era (since the 1963–64 season).
 Member of the Greek Basket League Hall of Fame, inducted as a player.

Greek national team
 1991 Mediterranean Games:

As a head coach
 Greek 2nd Division champion (2007)

References

External links 
Euroleague.net Profile
FIBA Profile
FIBA Europe Profile
 AEK Athens Profile
Hellenic Basketball Federation Profile 
Τα “κανόνια” του ελληνικού Πρωταθλήματος: Άγγελος Κορωνιός 

1969 births
Living people
1998 FIBA World Championship players
AEK B.C. coaches
AEK B.C. players
Basketball players from Athens
Competitors at the 1991 Mediterranean Games
Greek basketball coaches
Greek Basket League players
Greek men's basketball players
Kavala B.C. coaches
Maroussi B.C. players
Mediterranean Games medalists in basketball
Mediterranean Games silver medalists for Greece
Olympiacos B.C. players
Panionios B.C. players
P.A.O.K. BC players
Peristeri B.C. players
Point guards
Shooting guards
Sporting B.C. coaches